Makin Airport  is the airport serving Makin.

The airport is served twice a week by Air Kiribati from Bonriki, on Tarawa.

Airlines and destinations

References

Notes

Airports in Kiribati
Gilbert Islands